Montgomery Union Station and Trainshed is a historic former train station in Montgomery, Alabama. Built in 1898 by the Louisville and Nashville Railroad, rail service to the station ended in 1979 and it has since been adapted for use by the Montgomery Area Visitor Center and commercial tenants. It was added to the National Register of Historic Places in 1973 and became a National Historic Landmark in 1976.

History

Erected of brick and limestone on a high bluff along the Alabama River, the station was built by Louisville and Nashville Railroad (L&N) in 1898. The station also served passenger trains of Atlantic Coast Line, Western Railway of Alabama, Seaboard Air Line, Central of Georgia, and Gulf, Mobile and Ohio Railroad. The station had six tracks under a  shed, with a coach yard on the south end of the station as well as a Railway Express Agency facility. The station's design segregated passengers by race and incorporated Romanesque Revival elements.

L&N trains using the station included the Azalean, Florida Arrow, Humming Bird, Pan-American and South Wind. Traditionally, the Southern Railway's Crescent and Piedmont Limited were routed through the station. 

The number of passenger trains using Union Station declined during the 1950s and 1960s. The last Southern Railway train, the Crescent, left in 1970 when that train was rerouted north through Birmingham. The Pan American ended in 1971 when the L&N yielded passenger operations to Amtrak. When Amtrak came into existence in 1971, it continued passenger service through Montgomery with a single train (the South Wind, later renamed the Floridian), operating between Chicago and Miami. However, this train was terminated in 1979 and Union Station was closed.

After a period of disuse, Union Station was renovated for commercial tenants. The train shed still stands, although tracks under it have been replaced by asphalt parking. It was declared a National Historic Landmark in 1976, for its importance in the state's railroad transportation history, and for the train shed, a rare surviving example of a 19th-century gable-roofed shed (most of which were later replaced by balloon sheds).

Amtrak returned to Montgomery in 1989 with an extension of the Crescent called the Gulf Breeze from Birmingham to Mobile, but Union Station was not used. Instead, Amtrak contracted with a travel agent who occupied a former grain silo nearby. This Amtrak service was terminated in 1995, and Montgomery has had no passenger rail service since.

Among other tenants, Union Station currently hosts the Montgomery Area Visitor Center.

Gallery

See also

List of National Historic Landmarks in Alabama

References

External links

http://www.visitingmontgomery.com

National Register of Historic Places in Montgomery, Alabama
Buildings and structures in Montgomery, Alabama
Former Amtrak stations in Alabama
Historic American Engineering Record in Alabama
National Historic Landmarks in Alabama
Railway stations on the National Register of Historic Places in Alabama
Railway stations in the United States opened in 1898
Union stations in the United States
Transportation in Montgomery, Alabama
Romanesque Revival architecture in Alabama
Former Atlantic Coast Line Railroad stations
Former Seaboard Air Line Railroad stations
Former Mobile and Ohio Railroad stations
Former Louisville and Nashville Railroad stations
Former Central of Georgia Railway stations
Railroad-related National Historic Landmarks
Transportation buildings and structures in Montgomery County, Alabama
Railway stations closed in 1979